James Ellison may refer to:

James O. Ellison (1929–2014), U.S. federal judge
James T. Ellison (1862–1920s), New York gangster
James Ellison (actor) (1910–1993), American film actor
James Ellison (footballer, born 1901) (1901–1958), English footballer
James Ellison (footballer, born 1991), (born 1991) English footballer
James Ellison (motorcyclist) (born 1980), English motorcycle racer
James Ellison (white supremacist), (born c. 1941) American white supremacist leader
Jim Ellison (1964–1996), American singer
Jim Ellison (Michigan politician), American politician
James Ellison (Terminator), fictional character from The Sarah Connor Chronicles
Jim Ellison, fictional character from The Sentinel

See also
James Taylor Ellyson (1847–1919), political figure in Virginia